Adriana Carmona (born December 3, 1972 in Puerto La Cruz) is a Venezuelan taekwondo practitioner and Olympic medalist.

Olympic Games
She competed at the 2004 Summer Olympics in Athens, where she received a bronze medal in the +67 kg class.

She participated at the 1992 Summer Olympics in Barcelona where taekwondo was still a demonstration sport, and reached the semi finals winning a bronze medal in Woman's +70 kg.

She reached the semi finals at the 2000 Summer Olympics in Sydney.

International championships
Carmona won a gold medal at the 1995 Pan American Games in Mar del Plata, and received a silver medal at the 1999 Pan American Games in Winnipeg.

References

External links

1972 births
Living people
People from Puerto la Cruz
Olympic taekwondo practitioners of Venezuela
Taekwondo practitioners at the 2000 Summer Olympics
Taekwondo practitioners at the 2004 Summer Olympics
Olympic bronze medalists for Venezuela
Taekwondo practitioners at the 2008 Summer Olympics
Olympic medalists in taekwondo
Medalists at the 2004 Summer Olympics
Venezuelan female taekwondo practitioners
Medalists at the 1992 Summer Olympics
Pan American Games gold medalists for Venezuela
Pan American Games silver medalists for Venezuela
Pan American Games medalists in taekwondo
Taekwondo practitioners at the 1995 Pan American Games
Taekwondo practitioners at the 1999 Pan American Games
Taekwondo practitioners at the 2003 Pan American Games
World Taekwondo Championships medalists
Medalists at the 2003 Pan American Games
20th-century Venezuelan women
21st-century Venezuelan women